Cosford was a hundred of Suffolk, consisting of .

The hundred consisted of Hadleigh, the only town of any size, and seventeen other parishes in western Suffolk. The area is undulating and agriculturally-fertile with clay soil, watered by the River Brett and its tributary streams.

Cosford was in Coxford Union in the Liberty of St Edmund and in the Deanery and Archdeaconry of Sudbury. The area was until the nineteenth century part of the diocese of Norwich until it was moved to that of Ely. Hadleigh itself however is a peculiar of the Archbishop of Canterbury.

Listed as Cursforde in the Domesday Book and subsequently known for a period as Corsford or Corsforth, the name Cosford means "ford of the river Cors or Corsa".

Parishes
Cosford Hundred consisted of the following 17 parishes:

†Hadleigh hamlet is a separate township and part of Boxford parish in Babergh hundred.

References

Hundreds of Suffolk